Socialist patriotism is a form of patriotism promoted by Marxist–Leninist movements. Socialist patriotism promotes people living within Marxist–Leninist countries to adopt a "boundless love for the socialist homeland, a commitment to the revolutionary transformation of society [and] the cause of communism". Marxist–Leninists claim that socialist patriotism is not connected with nationalism, as Marxists and Marxist–Leninists denounce nationalism as a bourgeois ideology developed under capitalism that sets workers against each other. Socialist patriotism is commonly advocated directly alongside proletarian internationalism, with communist parties regarding the two concepts as compatible with each other. The concept has been attributed by Soviet writers to Karl Marx and Vladimir Lenin.

Lenin separated patriotism into what he defined as proletarian, socialist patriotism from bourgeois nationalism. Lenin promoted the right of all nations to self-determination and the right to unity of all workers within nations, however he also condemned chauvinism and claimed there were both justified and unjustified feelings of national pride. Lenin believed that nations subjected to imperial rule had the right to seek national liberation from imperial rule.

Countries' variants

Soviet Union

Initially the Soviet Russia and early Soviet Union adopted the idea of proletarian internationalism instead of nationalism on which patriotism is based. However, after the inability of socialist revolutions to abolish capitalism and national boundaries, Joseph Stalin promoted socialist patriotism following the theory of "socialism in one country".

Socialist patriotism would supposed serve both national interest and international socialist interest. While promoting socialist patriotism for the Soviet Union as a whole, Stalin repressed nationalist sentiments in fifteen republics of the Soviet Union. However, according to some academics Soviet patriotism had in practice Russian nationalist overtones.

China

The Communist Party of China and the government of China advocate socialist patriotism. The Communist Party of China describes the policy of socialist patriotism as the following: "Socialist patriotism has three levels. At the first level, individuals should subordinate their personal interests to the interests of the state. At the second level, individuals should subordinate their personal destiny to the destiny of our socialist system. At the third level, individuals should subordinate their personal future to the future of our communist cause." The PRC portrays the Communist government as the embodiment of the will of the Chinese people.

Mao Zedong spoke of a Chinese nation, but specified that the Chinese are a civic-based nation of multiple ethnic groups, and explicitly condemned Han ethnocentrism, which Mao called Han chauvinism and claimed had become widespread in China. The constitution of China states that China is a multi-ethnic society and that the state is opposed to national chauvinism and specifies Han chauvinism in particular.

East Germany
The Socialist Unity Party of Germany officially had socialist patriotism within its party statutes. The SED expanded on this by emphasizing a "socialist national consciousness" involving a "love for the GDR and pride in the achievements of socialism. However the GDR claimed that socialist patriotism was compatible with proletarian internationalism and stated that it should not be confused with nationalism that it associated with chauvinism and xenophobia.

Ethiopia
The Derg and the People's Democratic Republic of Ethiopia under Mengistu Haile Mariam advocated socialist patriotism. The Derg declared that "socialist patriotism" meant "true love for one's motherland...[and]...free[dom] from all forms of chauvinism and racialism".

North Korea
Kim Il-sung promoted socialist patriotism while he condemned nationalism in claiming that it destroyed fraternal relations between people because of its exclusivism. In North Korea, socialist patriotism has been described as an ideology meant to serve its own people, be faithful to their working class, and to be loyal to their own (communist) party.

Vietnam
The Communist Party of Vietnam and the government of Vietnam advocate "socialist patriotism" of the Vietnamese people. Vietnamese Communist leader Ho Chi Minh emphasized the role of socialist patriotism to Vietnamese communism, and emphasized the importance of patriotism, saying: "In the beginning it was patriotism and not communism which impelled me to believe in Lenin and the Third International."

After the collapse of the Indochinese Communist Party in 1941, the Vietnamese Communist movement since the 1940s fused the policies of proletarian internationalism and Vietnamese patriotism together. Vietnamese Communist Party leader Ho Chi Minh was responsible for the incorporation of Vietnamese patriotism into the Party, he had been born into a family with strong anticolonial political views towards French rule in Vietnam. The incorporation of Vietnamese patriotism into the Communist Party's agenda fit in with the longstanding Vietnamese struggle against French colonial rule. Although Ho opposed French colonial rule in Vietnam, he harboured no dislike of France as a whole, claiming that French colonial rule was "cruel and inhumane" but that the French people at home were good people. He had studied in France as a youth where he became an adherent to Marxism–Leninism, and he personally admired the French Revolutionary motto of "liberty, equality, fraternity". He witnessed the Treaty of Versailles that applied the principles of Woodrow Wilson's Fourteen Points that advocated national self-determination, resulting in the end of imperial rule over many peoples in Europe. He was inspired by the Wilsonian concept of national self-determination

Yugoslavia

The Socialist Federal Republic of Yugoslavia endorsed socialist patriotism, promoting the concept of "Brotherhood and Unity", where the Yugoslav nations would overcome their cultural and linguistic differences through promoting fraternal relations between the nations.

Cuba 
There is an element of socialist patriotism combined with left-wing nationalism within the Communist Party of Cuba in Cuba.

See also
Anti-imperialism
Left-wing nationalism
National Bolshevism
Social patriotism

References

Anti-imperialism
Ideology of the Chinese Communist Party
Ideology of the Communist Party of the Soviet Union
Patriotism
Marxism–Leninism